The Colombo crime family is an Italian American Mafia crime family and is the youngest of the "Five Families" that dominate organized crime activities in New York City within the criminal organization known as the American Mafia. It was during Lucky Luciano's organization of the American Mafia after the Castellammarese War, following the assassinations of "Joe the Boss" Masseria and Salvatore Maranzano, that the gang run by Joseph Profaci became recognized as the Profaci crime family.

The family traces its roots to a bootlegging gang formed by Profaci in 1928. Profaci would rule his family without interruption or challenge until the late 1950s.  The family has been torn by three internal wars. The first war took place during the late 1950s, when caporegime Joe Gallo revolted against Profaci, but that conflict lost momentum in the early 1960s when Gallo was arrested and Profaci died of cancer. The family was reunited in the early 1960s under Joseph Colombo. In 1971, the second family war began after Gallo's release from prison and the shooting of Colombo. Colombo supporters led by Carmine Persico won the second war after the exiling of the remaining Gallo crew to the Genovese family in 1975. The family would then enjoy over 15 years of peace under Persico and his string of acting bosses.

In 1991, the third and bloodiest war erupted when acting boss Victor Orena tried to seize power from the imprisoned Persico. The family split into factions loyal to Orena and to Persico, and two years of mayhem ensued.  It ended in 1993, with 12 members of the family dead and Orena imprisoned, leaving Persico the winner. Left with a family decimated by war, Persico continued to run the family until his death in prison in 2019, but it has never recovered. In the 2000s, the family was further weakened by multiple convictions in federal racketeering cases and numerous members becoming government witnesses. Many law enforcement agencies believe the Colombo crime family to be the weakest of the Five Families of New York City as of 2011.

History

Origins
In September 1921, Joseph Profaci arrived in New York City from Villabate, Sicily, Italy. After struggling in Chicago with his businesses, Profaci moved back to Brooklyn in 1925 and became a well-known olive oil importer. On September 27, Profaci obtained his American citizenship. With his olive-oil-importing business doing well, Profaci made deals with friends from his old town in Sicily, and one of his largest buyers was Tampa mobster Ignazio Italiano.

Profaci controlled a small criminal gang that operated mainly in Brooklyn. The dominant Cosa Nostra groups in Brooklyn were led by Frankie Yale, Giuseppe Masseria, Nicolo Schirò and capo di tutti capi Salvatore "Toto" D'Aquila.

On July 1, 1928, Yale was murdered by Chicago Outfit boss Al Capone's hit-men. Capone murdered Yale because Yale refused to give Capone, a Neapolitan, control over the Unione Siciliana fraternal association. Yale's murder allowed Profaci and his brother in-law Joseph Magliocco to gain territory for their small gang, including territory in Bensonhurst, Bay Ridge, Red Hook and Carroll Gardens, while the rest of Yale's group went to the Masseria family.

On October 10, 1928, D'Aquila was murdered, resulting in a fight for D'Aquila's territory. To prevent a gang war in Brooklyn, a Mafia meeting was called on December 5, 1928, at the Statler Hotel in Cleveland, Ohio. The site was chosen because it was neutral territory outside New York under Porrello crime family control and protection. The main topic was dividing D'Aquila's territory. Attendees representing Brooklyn included Profaci, Magliocco, Vincent Mangano (who reported to D'Aqulia family boss Manfredi Mineo), Joseph Bonanno (who represented Salvatore Maranzano and the Castellammarese Clan), Chicago mobsters Joseph Guinta and Pasquale Lolordo, and Tampa mobster Ignazio Italiano. At the end of the meeting, Profaci received a share of D'Aqulia's Brooklyn territory, with Magliocco as his second-in-command.

The Castellammarese War

Months after the D'Aquila murder, Joe Masseria began a campaign to become capo di tutti capi ('boss of bosses') in the United States, demanding tribute from the remaining three Mafia groups in New York City, which included the Reina family, the Castellammarese Clan and the Profaci family. Castellammarese Clan boss Salvatore Maranzano began his own campaign to become 'boss of bosses', which started the Castellammarese War.

Masseria, along with his ally Alfred Manfredi, the new boss of the D'Aquila family ordered the murder of Gaetano Reina. Masseria believed that Reina was going to support Maranzano in his fight to become the new 'boss of bosses'. On February 26, 1930, Gaetano Reina was murdered and Masseria appointed Joseph Pinzolo as the new boss of the Reina family. During the war Profaci remained neutral, while he secretly supported Maranzano.

The Castellammarese War ended when Charles "Lucky" Luciano, a Masseria lieutenant, betrayed him to Maranzano by setting up the murder of Masseria on April 15, 1931. Maranzano then declared himself the new capo di tutti capi in the United States.

Within a few months, Maranzano and Luciano were plotting to kill each other. On September 10, 1931, Luciano had Maranzano killed. Rather than claim the title of capo di tutti capi, Luciano instead created the Mafia Commission. Now there would be five independent Cosa Nostra families in New York City and twenty one additional families across the United States that were regulated by a supreme Commission in New York.  Profaci and Magliocco were confirmed as boss and underboss, respectively, of what was now known as the Profaci crime family.

First Family War (1960–1963)

Joseph Profaci had become a wealthy Mafia boss and was known as "the olive-oil and tomato paste king of America". One of Profaci's most unpopular demands was a $25 monthly tribute from every soldier in his family. In the late 1950s, capo Frank "Frankie Shots" Abbatemarco became a problem for Joe Profaci. Abbatemarco controlled a lucrative policy game that earned him nearly $2.5 million a year with an average of $7,000 a day in Red Hook, Brooklyn. In early 1959, Abbatemarco, with the support of Gallo brothers and the Garfield Boys, began refusing to pay tribute to Profaci.

By late 1959, Abbatemarco's debt had grown to $50,000 and Profaci allegedly ordered Joe Gallo to murder Abbatemarco. However, other versions of the story indicate that Gallo played no part in this murder. In return for Abbatemarco's murder, Profaci allegedly agreed to give the Gallos control over Abbatemarco's policy game.

On November 4, 1959, Frank Abbatemarco walked out of his cousin's bar in Park Slope, Brooklyn and was shot and killed by Joseph Gioielli and another hitman. Profaci then ordered the Gallos to hand over Abbatemaro's son Anthony. The Gallos refused and Profaci refused to give them the policy game. This was the start of the first family war. The Gallo brothers and the Garfield boys (led by Carmine Persico) were aligned against Profaci and his loyalists.

On February 27, 1961, the Gallos kidnapped four of Profaci's top men: underboss Magliocco, Frank Profaci (Joe Profaci's brother), capo Salvatore Musacchia and soldier John Scimone. Profaci himself eluded capture and flew to sanctuary in Florida. While holding the hostages, Larry and Albert Gallo sent Joe Gallo to California. Profaci's consigliere Charles "the Sidge" LoCicero negotiated with the Gallos and all the hostages were released peacefully.

However, Profaci had no intention of honoring this peace agreement. On August 20, 1961, Joseph Profaci ordered the murder of Gallo members Joseph "Joe Jelly" Gioielli and Larry Gallo. Gunmen allegedly murdered Gioielli after inviting him to go deep sea fishing. Gallo survived a strangulation attempt in the Sahara club of East Flatbush by Carmine Persico and Salvatore "Sally" D'Ambrosio after a police officer intervened. The Gallos then began calling Persico "The Snake" because he had betrayed them. The war continued, resulting in nine murders and three disappearances.

In late November 1961, Joe Gallo was sentenced to seven to fourteen years in prison for murder. In 1962, Joe Profaci died of cancer, leaving Joe Magliocco, his longtime underboss, as the new boss. The war continued on between the two factions. In 1963, Carmine Persico survived a car bombing and his enforcer Hugh McIntosh was shot in the groin as he attempted to kill Larry Gallo. On May 19, 1963, a Gallo hit team shot Carmine Persico multiple times, but Persico survived.

In 1963, Joseph Bonanno, the head of the Bonanno crime family, made plans to assassinate several rivals on the Mafia Commission—bosses Tommy Lucchese, Carlo Gambino, and Stefano Magaddino, as well as Frank DeSimone. Bonanno sought Magliocco's support, and Magliocco readily agreed. Not only was he bitter from being denied a seat on the Commission, but Bonanno and Profaci had been close allies for over 30 years prior to Profaci's death.

Bonanno's audacious goal was to take over the Commission and make Magliocco his right-hand man. Magliocco was assigned the task of killing Lucchese and Gambino, and gave the contract to one of his top hit men, Joseph Colombo. However, the opportunistic Colombo revealed the plot to its targets. The other bosses quickly realized that Magliocco could not have planned this himself. Knowing how close Bonanno was with Magliocco (and before him, Profaci), as well as their close ties through marriages, the other bosses concluded Bonanno was the real mastermind.

The Commission summoned Bonanno and Magliocco to explain themselves. Fearing for his life, Bonanno went into hiding in Montreal, leaving Magliocco to deal with the Commission. Badly shaken and in failing health, Magliocco confessed his role in the plot. The Commission spared Magliocco's life, but forced him to retire as Profaci family boss and pay a $50,000 fine. As a reward for turning on his boss, Colombo was awarded the Profaci family.

Colombo and Italian American Civil Rights League
The Commission rewarded Colombo for his loyalty by awarding him the Profaci family, which he renamed the Colombo family.  The 41-year-old Colombo was the youngest boss in New York at the time, and the first New York Mafia boss to have been born and raised in the United States.

Having risen to the top of the family at such a young age, Colombo knew that he had a potentially long reign ahead of him and that if he managed to outlive his fellow New York bosses, he could become not only the most powerful boss in New York but the most powerful boss in the whole country as well. Therefore, Colombo set about reshuffling the family's ranks, placing old-time gangsters in greater positions of power than the younger, more ambitious ones who could have potentially posed a threat to his rule. Colombo promoted elderly mobsters Salvatore “Charlie Lemons” Mineo and Benedetto D’Alessandro to underboss and consigliere, respectively. In doing so, Colombo also sought to stabilize the family after enduring such a tumultuous period of conflict. When D’Alessandro later retired in 1969, Colombo promoted Joseph “Joey Yack” Yacovelli to consigliere.

Along with former Gallo crew member Nicholas Bianco and New England family boss Raymond Patriarca, Colombo was also able to finally end the war with the Gallos. As a reward for his loyalty, Bianco was inducted into the Colombo family. In 1968, Gallo crew leader Larry Gallo died of cancer.

As boss, Colombo brought peace and stability to the broken crime family. However, some Cosa Nostra bosses viewed Colombo as Carlo Gambino's "puppet boss" and felt he never deserved the title. Colombo's leadership was never challenged due to his support from Carlo Gambino.

In April 1970, Colombo founded the Italian-American Civil Rights League, dedicated to fighting discrimination against Italian-Americans. Many mobsters disapproved of the League because it brought unwanted public attention to the Cosa Nostra. Colombo ignored their concerns and continued gaining support for his league.

On June 29, 1970, Colombo held the first league rally. In 1971, months before the second demonstration, the other New York bosses ordered their men to stay away from the demonstration and not support Colombo's cause. In a sign that the New York bosses had turned on Colombo, the league's chief organizer, Gambino family capo Joseph DeCicco, resigned, ostensibly due to ill health.

In 1971, Joe Gallo was also released from prison. At the time of his release, Gallo said the 1963 peace agreement did not apply to him because he was in prison when it was negotiated. As a supposedly conciliatory gesture, Colombo invited Gallo to a peace meeting with an offering of $1,000. Gallo refused the invitation, demanding $100,000 to stop the conflict, which Colombo rejected, instigating the Second Colombo War. At that point, Colombo issued a new order to kill Gallo.

Second Family War (1971–1975)
On June 28, 1971, Colombo held the second league rally at Columbus Circle in Manhattan. As Colombo prepared to speak, Jerome A. Johnson walked up to Colombo and shot him in the back of the head three times; seconds later, Colombo's bodyguards shot Johnson to death. The shooting did not kill Colombo but left him paralyzed for the last seven years of his life; he died of natural causes on May 22, 1978. Although many in the Colombo family blamed Joe Gallo for the shooting, the police eventually concluded that Johnson was a lone gunman after they had questioned Gallo.

Shortly after the Colombo shooting, a meeting of the high-ranking members of the family was held. At the meeting, underboss Salvatore “Charlie Lemons” Mineo was asked to take over as interim boss, but Mineo refused, citing his advanced age and failing health, and instead recommended that consigliere Joseph “Joey Yack” Yacovelli become acting boss.

Although the leadership of the Colombo family believed that Gallo was the mastermind behind the attempt on Colombo's life, Yacovelli opted not to pursue vengeance against Gallo right away. The New York Police Department may have contributed to Yacovelli's hesitation: although the police believed that Gallo was not involved in the Colombo shooting, they were aware that many members of the Colombo family did and would likely attempt to take revenge. Therefore, the police had assigned officers to follow Gallo around and ensure he was not harmed, making it nearly impossible for the Colombo family to get to Gallo. Killing Gallo so soon after the attempt on Colombo would also likely give the police the impression that a full-scale mob war was ensuing on the streets of New York and would therefore draw too much heat.

By early 1972, however, most of the publicity surrounding the Colombo shooting had faded away, and an open contract was subsequently placed on Gallo's head. On April 7, 1972, acting on a quick tip, four gunmen walked into Umberto's Clam House in Little Italy and killed Joe Gallo as he was dining with his family. Looking for revenge, Albert Gallo sent a gunman from Las Vegas to the Neapolitan Noodle restaurant in Manhattan, where Yacovelli, Alphonse Persico, and Gennaro Langella were dining one day. However, the gunman did not recognize the mobsters and shot four innocent diners instead, killing two of them.

After this assassination attempt, Yacovelli, fearing further attempts at reprisal from the Gallo crew, fled New York. With Yacovelli, the family's consigliere, now on the run and its underboss, Mineo, having previously made it clear that he had no interest in stepping up to the top position, the door appeared to be wide open for Persico, now a capo and the leader of a powerful faction within the family, to permanently take over as boss.

Persico, however, had been sent to prison on federal hijacking charges in January earlier that year, so another capo named Vincenzo Aloi, a son of well-respected former capo Sebastiano “Buster” Aloi as well as the godson of Carlo Gambino, became the new acting boss. Aloi's tenure as acting boss was to be short-lived as well, however, as he was convicted of perjury on June 26, 1973, for lying to a grand jury when he claimed he had not visited a Colombo family safe house in Nyack, New York prior to the Gallo murder. After his conviction, Aloi, who was free on bail pending an appeal, stepped down as acting boss.

Joseph “Joey” Brancato, acting capo for John “Sonny” Franzese while the latter was serving a 50-year sentence at Leavenworth for bank robbery, then stepped up and became acting boss. Brancato, however, had no interest in a permanent leadership position and only took the job of acting boss for the purpose of finally negotiating an end to the war with the Gallo crew, which by then had split itself into two groups that had started fighting each other. To finally resolve the conflict, Brancato and the bosses of the other New York families negotiated an agreement in which Albert Gallo and his remaining crew left the Colombo family and peacefully joined the Genovese family. The Gallo wars were finally over.

Having successfully negotiated a peaceful resolution to the Gallo wars, Brancato stepped down as acting boss and returned to running his Long Island crew. With no other viable candidates standing in his way, the imprisoned Persico officially took over the Colombo family by the end of 1973, placing Thomas DiBella in charge of the family as acting boss and promoting his brother Alphonse “Allie Boy” Persico to consigliere and Anthony “Tony Shots” Abbatemarco to underboss.

The family under Persico

Following the high-profile media exposure of Joseph Colombo and the murderous excesses of Joe Gallo, the Colombo family entered a period of comparative calm and stability. With Colombo in a coma, the family leadership went to Thomas DiBella, a man adept at evading the authorities since his sole bootlegging conviction in 1932. However, DiBella was unable to prevent the Gambino family from chipping away at Colombo rackets, and the Colombos declined in power. Poor health forced DiBella to retire in 1977, and Colombo died in 1978. The Colombo family was facing another power vacuum.

During the 1970s, Carmine Persico had grown in stature within the family and was considered to be the clear successor as boss. However, in 1973, Persico was imprisoned on hijacking and loan-sharking charges, and sentenced to eight years in prison. His incarceration coincided with the release of his brother Alphonse from 17 years in prison. Persico designated Alphonse as acting boss with support as underboss from Gennaro Langella and Carmine's other brother, Theodore. Langella supervised various labor rackets for the family, including their stake in "Concrete Club", and exerted control over various labor unions, including Cement and Concrete Workers District Council, Local 6A.

In 1979, Carmine was released from federal prison. In November 1981, he was convicted of conspiracy and racketeering charges, and sentenced to five years in prison.

On February 25, 1985, nine New York Mafia leaders, including Langella, followed by Persico, were indicted for narcotics trafficking, loansharking, gambling, labor racketeering and extortion against construction companies, as part of the Mafia Commission Trial. Prosecutors aimed to strike at all the crime families at once using their involvement in the Commission. Seven of the defendants were convicted of racketeering on November 19, 1986, with Persico and Langella each sentenced on January 13, 1987, to 100 years' imprisonment. In the separate Colombo Trial, Persico was sentenced to 39 years' imprisonment, Langella to 65 years' imprisonment, and Alphonse Persico to 12 years, on November 17, 1986.

Mafia historian and The New York Times organized-crime reporter Selwyn Raab later wrote that the Colombos suffered more long-term damage than any other family as a result of the Commission Trial. Raab pointed out that Persico was by far the youngest boss in New York and "at the peak of his abilities." Although he was 53 years old at the time of the Commission Trial, he had already headed the family for 14 years. In contrast, the other New York bosses were in their seventies and likely would have ceded power to mafiosi of Persico's generation even if they had not been sent to prison. Raab believed that Persico would have had a long reign ahead of him had the trial not intervened.

Although Persico knew he would never resume active control of the family, he was determined to ensure that his take of the family's illicit gains would continue to flow to his relatives. He had already named Alphonse as acting boss before his arrest, and retained Alphonse in that post after his arrest. However, not long afterward, Alphonse skipped bail from a loansharking arrest. Persico then named a three-man ruling panel to run the family. In 1988, he dissolved the panel and named Victor Orena, the capo of Little Allie Boy's former crew in Brooklyn, as temporary acting boss. Persico made clear that Orena was merely a placeholder until Little Allie Boy could return to the streets. However, Persico empowered Orena to induct new members and order murders on his own authority–two prerogatives rarely granted to an acting boss.

Third Family War (1991–1993)

By 1991, Orena had come to believe Persico was out of touch and causing the family to miss out on lucrative opportunities. He was also alarmed at Persico's plans for a made-for-television biography, fearing that prosecutors could use it as evidence in the same way they had used Joe Bonanno's tell-all book as evidence in the Commission Trial. He therefore decided to take over the family himself.

Using his strong ties to Gambino boss John Gotti, Orena petitioned the Mafia Commission to recognize him as boss. Unwilling to cause more conflict, the Commission refused. Orena then instructed consigliere Carmine Sessa to poll the capos on whether Orena should replace Persico. Instead, Sessa alerted Persico that Orena was staging a palace coup. An enraged Persico ordered a hit on Orena. On June 21, 1991, when Orena arrived at his home in Cedarhurst on Long Island, he found gunmen under Sessa's leadership waiting for him. However, Orena managed to escape before the gunmen could strike. The third Colombo war had begun.

Orena sent his younger brother Michael "Mickey Brown" Orena's two sons—Michael and younger son William "Willy Boy" Orena—into Brooklyn on a murder mission. It is unclear what roles the two brothers played in the murders during the war, but F.B.I agents are certain they were responsible for the disappearance of 15 associates and business partners of the Orena clan. William "Willy Boy" Orena was picked up getting off of the Fire Island Ferry in Sayville Long Island, with eight pistols believed to be used in the bloodshed and $43,000 in cash in his possession. During Willy Boy's stay at the Riverhead County Jail, all eight of the firearms disappeared from the evidence locker.

Twelve people, including three innocent bystanders, died in this gang war, and 18 associates have never been seen again. More than 80 made members and associates from both sides of the Colombo family were convicted, jailed or indicted. These included Persico's brother Theodore "Teddy" Persico and his son Alphonse Persico, DeRoss, Orena's nephews William V. Orena, his older brother Micheal Orena, and Orena's two sons, Victor Jr. Orena and John Orena. While both sides appealed to the Commission for help, the war continued. In November 1991, Gregory Scarpa, a Persico loyalist, was driving his daughter and granddaughter home when several Orena gunmen ambushed them. Scarpa and his relatives managed to escape.

The war continued until 1992, when Orena was convicted of racketeering, the 1989 Ocera murder, and other related charges. He received three life sentences plus 85 years in federal prison. 58 soldiers and associates—42 from the Persico faction and 16 from the Orena faction—were sent to prison. Raab later wrote that Persico's attempts to keep control of the family from prison nearly destroyed it. By his estimate, 70 of the family's members and associates were convicted as a result of the war, and the family was down to around 75 made members.

While the Colombo war raged, the Commission refused to allow any Colombo member to sit on the Commission and considered dissolving the family. Lucchese underboss Anthony Casso proposed to merge the family with his own to end the war, while in 2000 plans were proposed to split its manpower and resources among the remaining families. In 2002, with the help of Bonanno family boss Joseph Massino, the other families finally allowed the Colombos to rejoin the Commission.

The family after Third Colombo War

With Orena out of the picture, the way was clear for "Little Allie Boy" to become acting boss after his release in 1994. In 1994, Carmine Persico appointed Andrew Russo as acting boss. When Russo went to prison in 1996, Alphonse Persico took over as acting boss. In 1999, he was arrested in Fort Lauderdale after being caught in possession of a pistol and shotgun; as a convicted felon he was barred from carrying guns.

Shortly afterward, he ordered the murder of underboss William "Wild Bill" Cutolo, an Orena supporter during the Third Colombo War. Cutolo's son, vowing revenge, offered to wear a wire and pose as a prospective Colombo associate. Based on evidence from this wire, Little Allie Boy was indicted on RICO charges. Realizing he stood no chance of acquittal, he pled guilty to the state charges in February 2000 and to the RICO charges in December 2001. In 2004, Alphonse Persico and underboss John "Jackie" DeRoss were indicted for the Cutolo murder. In December 2007, both men were convicted and sentenced to life in prison. Family consigliere Joel "Joe Waverly" Cacace took over running the family until 2003, when he was imprisoned on murder and racketeering charges.

The family then came under the influence of Thomas "Tommy Shots" Gioeli, who took over as street boss. In June 2008, Gioeli, underboss John "Sonny" Franzese, former consigliere Joel Cacace, captain Dino Calabro, soldier Dino Saracino and several other members and associates, including Orlando "Ori" Spado, were indicted on multiple racketeering charges, including loansharking, extortion and three murders dating back to the Colombo Wars. Alphonse Persico was sentenced to life imprisonment on February 27, 2009, for the Cutolo murder.

After Gioeli was imprisoned, Ralph F. DeLeo, who operated from Boston, Massachusetts, became the family's street boss. On December 17, 2009, the FBI charged DeLeo and Colombo family members with drug trafficking, extortion and loansharking in Massachusetts, Rhode Island, New York, Florida and Arkansas.

Current position
With DeLeo imprisoned, Andrew "Andy Mush" Russo once again took control of the family. On January 20, 2011, street boss Andrew Russo, acting underboss Benjamin Castellazzo, consigliere Richard Fusco, and others were charged with murder, narcotics trafficking, and labor racketeering. In September 2011, Castellazzo and Fusco pleaded guilty to reduced charges. In December 2011, it was revealed that capo Reynold Maragni wore a wire for the FBI and gained information about Thomas Gioeli's role in the 1999 murder of William Cutolo.

On July 11, 2018, four associates and members of the Colombo crime family were part of a 32-count indictment charging then with a number of crimes, including money laundering, racketeering, illegal gambling and extortion. The crimes allegedly took place between December 2010 and June 2018, predominantly in Brooklyn and Staten Island. Two made members of the Colombo family, Vito DiFalco and Jerry Ciauri, were among the accused. Gambino crime family soldier Anthony Licata was also indicted.

On March 7, 2019, Colombo family boss Carmine Persico died in prison. With Carmine Persico's death, his son Alphonse Persico was passed over and his cousin Andrew "Mush" Russo became the official boss of the Colombo family. Russo's inner circle included underboss Benjamin "Benji" Castellazzo, consigliere Ralph DiMatteo, capo Vincent "Vinny Unions" Ricciardo, capo Richard Ferrara and capo Theodore "Teddy" Persico Jr.

On October 3, 2019, capo Joseph Amato along with Daniel Capaldo and Thomas Scorcia were indicted on 2014 Staten Island extortion and loansharking charges. On March 22, 2021, Amato pleaded guilty.

On August 13, 2020, an indictment charged Colombo family associate Frangesco "Frankie" Russo, Genovese family soldier Christopher Chierchio, attorney Jason "Jay" Kurland and securities broker Frank Smookler with conspiracy, wire fraud and money laundering. The indictment accused the "lottery attorney" Kurland, along with Russo, Chierchio and Smookler, of swindling $80 million from jackpot winners in an illegal scheme which involved siphoning money from the winners' investments. Frangesco "Frankie" Russo has been identified as the son of former Colombo captain Joseph “JoJo” Russo, and the grandson of Andrew "Mush" Russo, the reputed boss of the Colombo family.

On September 14, 2021, an indictment was served that included the Colombo family's official boss, Andrew "Mush" Russo, underboss Benjamin "Benji" Castellazzo, consigliere Ralph "Big Ralphie" DiMatteo, captains Vincent Ricciardi, Richard Ferrara and Theodore "Teddy" Persico Jr., soldier Michael Uvino, and associates Thomas Costa and Domenick Ricciardo. The indictment charged these members of the Colombo family with infiltrating and taking control of a Queens-based labor union and its affiliated health care benefit program, as well as conspiring to commit fraud in connection with workplace safety certifications. Ralph DiMatteo was not present when the indictment was served and was declared a fugitive, but surrendered to the FBI on September 17, 2021.

On April 20, 2022, Andrew Russo's lawyer Jeffrey Lichtman announced that Russo died at the age of 87 on April 18, 2022. On April 23, 2022, Andrew Russo's funeral was attended by 100 mourners in Brooklyn.

Historical leadership

Boss (official and acting)
 1928–1962 — Joseph Profaci – died of natural causes
 1962–1963 — Joseph Magliocco – forced to retire by Mafia Commission
 1963–1971 — Joseph Colombo – paralyzed by assassination attempt
Acting 1971–1972 — Joseph Yacovelli – fled, after the murder of Joe Gallo
Acting 1972–1973 – Vincenzo Aloi – imprisoned
Acting 1973 — Joseph "Joey" Brancato – stepped down
 1973–2019 — Carmine "Junior" Persico – imprisoned 1973–1979, 1981–1984, 1985–2019, died on March 7, 2019
Acting 1973–1979 — Thomas DiBella  – stepped down, became consigliere
Acting 1981–1983 — Alphonse "Allie Boy" Persico – Carmine Persico's brother; fugitive 1980–1987, imprisoned
Acting 1983–1984 — Gennaro "Gerry Lang" Langella – imprisoned
Acting 1985–1987 — Anthony "Scappy" Scarpati – imprisoned
Acting 1987–1991 — Vittorio "Vic" Orena – imprisoned sentenced to life
Acting 1991–1993 — Vacant – disputed leadership during the third war
Acting 1994–1996 — Andrew "Andy Mush" Russo – imprisoned March 1997
Acting 1996–2019 — Alphonse "Little Allie Boy" Persico – Carmine Persico's son; imprisoned sentenced to life in  2009,
2019–2022 — Andrew "Andy Mush" Russo – indicted on September 14, 2021. Died on April 18, 2022.

Street boss
1987 — Ruling Panel – Benedetto Aloi, Vincent "Jimmy" Angelino and Joseph T. Tomasello – disbanded September 1987
1991–1993 — Joseph T. Tomasello
1993–1994 — Ruling Panel – Joseph T. Tomasello, Theodore "Teddy" Persico and Joseph Baudanza – disbanded 1994
1994–1996 — Alphonse "Little Allie Boy" Persico – became acting boss
1996–1999 — Andrew "Andy Mush" Russo – imprisoned
2000–2003 — Joel "Joe Waverly" Cacace – imprisoned January 2003
2003–2008 — Thomas "Tommy Shots" Gioeli – imprisoned June 2008
2008–2009 — Ralph F. DeLeo – operated from New England, imprisoned December 2009
2009–2010 — Ruling Panel – Theodore N. Persico Jr. (jailed) and others
2010–2011 — Andrew "Andy Mush" Russo – jailed January 2011
2013–2014 — Salvatore "Sally Bread" Cambria  – stepped down
2014–2019 — Andrew "Andy Mush" Russo – released from prison on June 13, 2013, became official boss 2019

Underboss (official and acting)
1928–1962 — Joseph "Joe Malyak" Magliocco – promoted to boss
1962–1963 — Salvatore "Sally the Sheik" Musacchio – brother-in-law to Joseph Magliocco
1963–1967 — John "Sonny" Franzese – Imprisoned
1967–1973 — Charles "Charlie Lemons" Mineo – stepped down
1973–1977 — Anthony "Tony Shots" Abbatemarco – fled
Acting 1973–1975 — Andrew "Andy Mush" Russo
1977–1981 — Alphonse "Allie Boy" Persico – Carmine Persico's brother; promoted to acting boss
1981–1994 — Gennaro "Gerry Lang" Langella – promoted to acting boss
Acting 1983–1987 — John "Sonny" Franzese
Acting 1987— Benedetto "Benny" Aloi
Acting 1991–1993 — Vacant — disputed leadership during the third war
1994–1999 — Joel "Joe Waverly" Cacace – became consigliere
Acting 1994–1999 — Benedetto "Benny" Aloi
1999 — William "Wild Bill" Cutolo – murdered 1999
1999–2004 — John DeRoss – imprisoned life sentence
Acting 2001–2003 — Thomas Gioeli – promoted to street boss
2004–2011 — John "Sonny" Franzese – On January 14, 2011, was sentenced to eight years in prison; released June 23, 2017
Acting 2008–2009 — Theodore "Skinny Teddy" Persico Jr. – Theodore Persico's son; joined the ruling panel
Acting 2009–2011 — Benjamin "Benji" Castellazzo – jailed January 2011
2015–present — Benjamin "Benji" Castellazzo – released from prison on August 14, 2015; indicted on September 14, 2021

Consigliere (official and acting)
1931–1954 — Salvatore Profaci – Joseph Profaci's brother; died
1954–1963 — Calogero "Charles the Sidge" LoCicero – murdered 1968
1963–1969 — Benedetto D'Alessandro
1969–1971 — Joseph "Joey Yack" Yacovelli – became acting boss 1971
1973–1977 — Alphonse "Allie Boy" Persico – Carmine Persico's brother; promoted to underboss
1977–1983 — Thomas "Old Man" DiBella – stepped down
1983–1988 — Alphonse "Allie Boy" Persico – Carmine Persico's brother; died in 1989
Acting 1983–1986 — Thomas "Old Man" DiBella – retired
Acting 1987–1988 — Vincent "Jimmy" Angellina – murdered
1988–1993 — Carmine Sessa – later became a government informant
Acting 1988–1991 — Benedetto "Benny" Aloi – promoted to acting underboss
Acting 1991–1993 — Vacant – disputed leadership during the third war
1993–1999 — Vincenzo Aloi
1999–2008 — Joel "Joe Waverly" Cacace – imprisoned 2004
Acting 2001–2004 — Ralph "Ralphie" Lombardo
Acting 2004–2008 — Vincenzo Aloi
2008–2011 — Richard "Richie Nerves" Fusco – jailed January 2011
2011–2019 — Thomas "Tom Mix" Farese – In December 2012, Farese was acquitted of money laundering charges. He currently operates in South Florida.
2019–present — Ralph "Big Ralphie" DiMatteo – indicted on September 14, 2021

Factions of the third war
The Colombo crime family divided into two factions during the third family war (1991 to 1993).

The Persico faction
Boss – Carmine "Junior" Persico
Acting boss – Joseph T. Tomasello
Underboss – Gerry Langella
Acting underboss – Joseph "JoJo" Russo
Consigliere – Carmine Sessa

The Orena faction
Faction Boss – Vittorio "Vic" Orena
Faction Underboss – Benedetto "Benny" Aloi
Faction Acting Underboss – Joseph Scopo
Faction Consigliere – Vincenzo Aloi

Current family members

Administration
Boss – Unknown, the last known boss was Andrew "Mush" Russo, who died on April 18, 2022.
Underboss – Benjamin "Benji" Castellazzo  – also known as "The Claw", is the current underboss in the family. Castellazzo is the former capo of the Gravesend Brooklyn crew. In 2000, Castellazzo was indicted along Michael Nobile, Anthony Amoruso, Frank DeVito, Stephen Mignano, Joey Mercuri, and Joseph Wiley on illegal gambling chargers in Gravesend, Brooklyn. On January 20, 2011, Castellazzo was indicted on federal racketeering charges. In September 2011, Castellazzo pleaded guilty to a reduced charge. On January 30, 2013, Castellazzo was sentenced to 63 months in prison. Castellazzo was released from federal custody on August 14, 2015. On September 14, 2021, Castellazzo was indicted and charged along with boss Andrew Russo, consigliere Ralph DiMatteo and three captains Theodore Persico Jr., Richard Ferrara and Vincent Ricciardo with infiltrating and taking control of a Queens-based labor union.
Consigliere – Ralph "Big Ralphie" DiMatteo – is the current consigliere in the family. On September 14, 2021, DiMatteo was indicted and charged along with boss Andrew Russo, underboss Benjamin Castellazzo and three captains, Theodore Persico Jr., Richard Ferrara and Vincent Ricciardo, with infiltrating and taking control of a Queens-based labor union. DiMatteo was not physically rounded up in the initial arrests, and was considered a fugitive. On September 17, after his son's tweets blew his Florida cover he surrendered to the FBI at 26 Federal Plaza in Manhattan.

Caporegimes
Brooklyn faction
Theodore N. "Skinny Teddy" Persico Jr. – capo and son of Theodore Persico Sr. He helped lead the family from 2008, until his arrest in 2009. He worked with his cousins Michael Persico and Lawrence Persico. He was released from prison on May 29, 2020. Persico Jr. was rounded up in an extensive indictment against the family that took place on September 14, 2021.
Richard Ferrara – capo of a Brooklyn crew, Ferrara was indicted on September 14, 2021, along with several members of the family. He was released on bond on January 7, 2022 after putting up $10 million secured by three shopping centers on the Jersey Shore that he co-owns with his brother. In December 2022, Ferrara pled guilty to shaking down UCTIE Local 621.
Salvatore "Sally Bread" Cambria – capo and former street boss. In 2002, Cambria was identified as a soldier in the Colombo family, during the trial of Lucchese family consigliere Joseph "Joe C." Caridi, who had ordered a Freeport restaurant to buy bread from Cambria.
William "Billy" Russo – capo and the youngest son of Andrew Russo. His brother Joseph "Jo Jo" Russo died in prison in 2007.

Staten Island faction
Joseph "Joe" Amato – capo operating a loansharking operation on Staten Island. On October 3, 2019, Amato along with son Joseph Amato Jr., soldiers Daniel Capaldo and Thomas Scorcia and associate Anthony Silvestro were indicted on 2014, Staten Island extortion and loansharking charges. His son Joseph Amato Jr. lost his million dollar bail because of his father's reputation. On March 22, 2021, Amato and his son accepted plea deals on all charges. In October 2021, Amato was sentenced to 70 months in prison.

Bronx
Dennis "Fat Dennis" DeLucia — capo with gambling operations in the Bronx. In 2011, he was indicted along with acting boss Andrew Russo, soldiers Ilario Sessa and Joseph Savarese and Angelo Spata the son-in-law to Carmine Persico. In 2012, he pleaded guilty to extortion of a rival gambling club in the Bronx and before his sentencing his lesbian daughter described him as "a same-sex marriage supporter, despite his role in the Mafia". DeLucia was released from prison on July 12, 2013.

Long Island faction
Ralph "Ralphie" Lombardo – capo and former acting consigliere. Lombardo runs bookmaking and loansharking activities on Long Island. In 1975, Lombardo was convicted of conspiracy of selling stock in an automobile leasing company in New Jersey. In 2003, Lombardo was the consigliere and he was indicted on illegal gambling, loan-sharking and witness tampering. He was released from prison on August 27, 2006.
 Acting – Luca DiMatteo – longtime acting captain of the Lombardo crew. His younger brother Ralph DiMatteo is the family's consigliere. On July 9, 2015, DiMatteo along with his nephew Luca "Lukey" DiMatteo were indicted and charged with racketeering conspiracy, extortion, loansharking, and operating an illegal gambling business in Brooklyn and elsewhere between January 2009 and June 2015. The indictment identified DiMatteo as a longtime acting captain in the Colombo family. On September 9, 2016, DiMatteo was sentenced to 33 months in prison. He was released from prison on January 8, 2018.
Vincent "Vinnie Unions" Ricciardo – capo of a Long Island crew, Ricciardo took over John Franzese's old crew. He was indicted on September 14, 2021, along with several members of the family.

Soldiers
New York

Craig "Little Craig" Marino – family soldier. In March 2006, Marino was indicted for extortion.
John Maggio – family soldier. In February 2012, Maggio was sentenced to under house arrest for illegally trafficking 200 cartons of contraband cigarettes.
Andrew "Andre" D'Apice – family soldier.<ref>{{cite web |title=Teddy' Persico Wants Tapes of His Gun-Cleaning Tips Suppressed |url=https://www.nysun.com/article/new-york-teddy-persico-wants-tapes-of-his-gun-cleaning |website=NY SUN |access-date=10 July 2022}}</ref> D'Apice was indicted alongside Theodore Persico Jr., his cousin, for extortion and racketeering.
Joseph "Chubby" Audino – family soldier and Orena faction loyalist during the Colombo mafia war in the 1990s. In 1994, he was sentenced to  years imprisonment for tax fraud.
Giovanni "John" Cerbone – Cerbone is part of the Staten Island crew run by Joseph Amato. In 2015, he pleaded guilty to money laundering, distribution of cocaine, marijuana, and oxycodone pills. Cerbone was sentenced to 5-years imprisonment.
Thomas Scorcia – On October 3, 2019, he was part of an indictment targeting members of the Colombo family for racketeering, extortion and loansharking. Scorcia was overheard on a wiretap discussing a scheme to fix an NCAA college basketball game.
Alphonse "Little Allie Boy" Persico – is Carmine Persico's son and former acting boss of the family. In 2009, Alphonse was sentenced to life in prison and is currently in the FCI McKean in Pennsylvania. In March 2019, his father and longtime boss Carmine Persico died in prison.
Salvatore "Sally Boy" Castagno – former capo of the "Gravesend-Coney Island crew" (aka "East Third Street Clique") which was previously controlled by Benjamin Castellazzo.
Thomas "Tom Mix" Farese – is the former consigliere and was Carmine Persico's nephew through marriage. His wife Suzanne is the daughter of the late Alphonse Persico (Carmine Persico's brother). Despite his promotion to consigliere, Farese maintained the control of the Florida faction. During the 1970s, Farese moved from Boston to Fort Lauderdale, Florida where he became friends with Colombo mobster Nicholas Forlano. In July 1978, Farese was inducted into the Colombo family. In 1980, he was convicted of smuggling marijuana, sentenced to 30 years in prison, and he was released in 1994. In 1998, Farese pleaded guilty to money laundering. On January 5, 2012, Farese was indicted on loansharking and money laundering charges in South Florida and was released on bail. Prosecutors obtained evidence on Farese through a recording device on government informant Reynold Maragni. During his trial in September the judge allowed Farese lawyer to inspect informant Reynold Maragni's wristwatch that contained secret recording device. In December 2012, Farese was acquitted of all chargesBureau of Prisons Inmate Locator: Thomas Ralph Farese (Released) In April 2021, Farese was charged with one count of federal healthcare fraud. He and several partners, including Colombo associate Patrick Truglia, owned an orthotic brace supply company in Florida from 2017 to 2019, nominally owned by others, which engaged in kickback schemes to bribe medical providers and telehealth services to unnecessarily prescribe elderly patients with braces, which would be charged to Medicare. The court dockets of Farese and Truglia were sealed, unlike the other defendants in the case. The indictment did not mention Farese's ties to organized crime.
Joel "Joe Waverly" Cacace — former consigliere and street boss.
Michael Uvino — a former capo, Uvino ran his crew from "The sons of Italy Social Club" in Hauppauge, Long Island. In 2009, Uvino was sentenced to 10 years for running illegal card games on Long Island and for assaulting two men. His release date was May 24, 2016. He was indicted in September 2021 along with Andrew Russo, Benjamin Castellazzo, Ralph DiMatteo and other members.
Michael Catapano — former acting captain and a nephew of John Franzese who was involved in extorting gambling clubs on Long Island. In 2008, Catapano was indicted along with acting boss Thomas Gioeli, underboss John "Sonny" Franzese and other members of the crime family. In November 2010, he was sentenced to  years imprisonment after he had pleaded guilty to conspiracy to commit extortion and conspired to sell 50 kilograms of cocaine. He was released on April 29, 2016.
Joseph Baudanza — former capo with operations in Brooklyn, Manhattan and Staten Island. Baudanza along with his brother Carmine and nephew John Baudanza were arrested and convicted on stock fraud in 2008.Horowitz, Carl (March 1, 2010) "Colombo Mobsters Charged with Extortion, Theft of Teamster Benefits"  National Legal and Policy Center Baudanza was released from prison in February 2011.
Thomas "Tommy Shots" Gioeli — former capo and former street boss that operated in Brooklyn, Staten Island and Long Island. In June 2008, along with John Franzese, Joel Cacace, Dino Calabro and Dino Saracino were indicted on multiple racketeering and murders from the third Colombo family War. In 2011, Gioeli's acting capo Paul Bevacqua became a government informant. As of September 2015, Gioeli is incarcerated in federal prison with a projected release date of September 9, 2024.
James "Jimmy Green Eyes" Clemenza — a former capo operating in Brooklyn. On August 25, 1961, he tried to strangle Larry Gallo with a rope in a Brooklyn bar. In the mid-1990s, Clemenza along with his brother Gerard "Jerry", and brothers Chris and Anthony Colombo, were placed on the "shelf" for backing Orena during the family war. In 1999, Clemenza along with his brother Jerry were under FBI surveillance attending a dinner in a Little Italy restaurant on Mulberry Street with cast members of "The Sopranos".
Vincenzo "Vinny" Aloi – former consigliere, semi-retired in 2008, is residing in Florida.
John "Jackie" DeRoss – a soldier serving life in prison after his 2009 conviction for the 1999 William Cutolo murder. DeRoss is a brother-in-law to Carmine Persico and served as underboss from 1999 to 2004.Staff (November 4, 2006) "Mistrial Is Declared in Mob Murder Case" The New York Times 
Daniel Persico – the son of Theodore Persico. In March 2000, Daniel was arrested and later convicted on a pump and dump stock scam. He was released from prison on November 14, 2003.
Vincent Langella – the son of Gennaro Langella. In 2001, Langella pleaded guilty to racketeering conspiracy. On July 3, 2001, he was sentenced to 27 months in prison. Langella was released on April 12, 2005. 
Vincent "Chickie" DeMartino - a soldier. In 1993, DeMartino was sentenced to four years in prison on weapons charges. In 1999, Alphonse Persico ordered DeMartino and Thomas Gioeli to murder William Cutolo. On July 16, 2001, DeMartino and Michael Spataro attempted to murder Joseph Campanella, but failed."Echoes of Mob War Reverberate 15 Years Later" New York Sun July 20, 2006 In May 2004, Campanella testified against DeMartino. DeMartino has a projected release date of January 1, 2025.
Dino "Little Dino" Saracino - born in 1972 in Castellammare del Golfo, Sicily, he and his family moved to Bensonhurst, Brooklyn, shortly after he was born. He was sentenced to 50 years in April 2014 and was sent to a Pennsylvania federal prison to do his time; acquitted of murdering NYPD police officer Ralph Dols although he was convicted of witness tampering, extortion and murder conspiracy. During the Colombo war in the 1990s, Saracino was loyal to Carmine Persico. He plotted to murder Michael Burnside during that time as retribution for taking his brother' life. It is apparent that he became an initiated soldier after either killing Dols in 1997 or high ranking Colombo member Joseph Scopo in 1993 however according to law he was found not guilty. His brother Sebastian "Sebby" Saracino testified against him at his trial. It is known that Saracino was close and a member of Thomas Gioeli's crew. In October 2017, he appealed his conviction and it was denied.

Imprisoned Soldiers
 Aurelio "Ray" Cagno – born in November 1940. Cagno was convicted for the May 1993 murder of James "Jimmy" Randazzo, alleged to be cooperating with authorities. Cagno was convicted in June 2004 for the murder and he was sentenced to life imprisonment. His brother, Rocco Cagno, testified in court that he and Aurelio had been active with the Colombo family since the early 1970s and both became soldier's in 1987.
 John DeRoss – born in July 1937. DeRoss was convicted of murder and was sentenced to life imprisonment in December 2007.
 Joseph "Joe Monte" Monteleone – born in 1940. Monteleone was a Persico loyalist during the 1990s Colombo family war. Monteleone was sentenced to life imprisonment on murder and racketeering charges.
Anthony "Chucky" Russo – a soldier and former capo. His cousin is William "Billy" Russo and his uncle was Andrew "Andy" Russo. In the 1990s, during the third family war Anthony Russo worked closely with his now deceased cousin Joseph "JoJo" Russo in Brooklyn and Long Island. Russo and his cousin "JoJo" Russo, were Persico loyalists who attempted to kill Victor Orena in June 1991. In November 2022, Russo was granted a reduced life sentence and will be eligible for release in six years. Russo has a current release date of February 3, 2023.
 Dino "Little Dino" Saracino – was sentenced to 50-years imprisonment. In 2012, he was acquitted of the murders of William "Wild Bill" Cutolo, NYPD officer Ralph Dols and the 1995 execution of Colombo associate Richard Greaves. His brother, Sebby Saracino, testified against him in 2012 to avoid a 70-year prison sentence.
 Michael Sessa – Persico loyalist and acting Colombo family caporegime. Sessa is serving life imprisonment for murder and racketeering.

Massachusetts 
Ralph F. DeLeo — from Somerville, Massachusetts he led the New England faction of the family. During the 1990s, while in prison he met Alphonse Persico; when he was released in 1997, he was inducted into the Colombo crime family. In 2008, DeLeo became street boss after Thomas Gioeli was arrested. On December 17, 2009, DeLeo was indicted on racketeering charges from crimes in five different states. He is currently imprisoned with a release date of October 2, 2025.

Associates
Lawrence "Larry" Persico – the son of former family boss Carmine Persico and brother to Alphonse Persico and Michael Persico. In 2004, Larry was indicted on racketeering charges. His father wrote a letter to the courts defending his son. Lawrence was sentenced on March 11, 2005, and released on December 9, 2005.
Michael Joseph Persico – the son of imprisoned family boss Carmine Persico and brother to Alphonse Persico and Lawrence Persico. In 2010, Michael was accused of racketeering conspiracy involving debris removal contracts for the site of the former World Trade Center. In 2011, Michael was indicted for supplying firearms in the 1993 murder of Joseph Scopo.
Sean Persico – the son of Theodore Persico and brother to Daniel, Frank, and Theodore Jr., Sean was involved in stock scams.
Frangesco "Frankie" Russo – the son of former Colombo captain Joseph "JoJo" Russo and grandson of Colombo boss Andrew "Mush" Russo. On August 13, 2020, an indictment charged Frankie Russo, Genovese family soldier Christopher Chierchio, attorney Jason "Jay" Kurland and securities broker Frank Smookler with conspiracy, wire fraud and money laundering. The indictment accused the "lottery attorney" Kurland along with Russo, Chierchio and Smookler with swindling $80 million of dollars from jackpot winners in an illegal scheme of siphoning money from the jackpot winners' investments.

Family crews
The Garfield Boys – was an Italian American street gang that operated in South Brooklyn sections of Red Hook and Gowanus. The gang was headed by future Colombo boss Carmine Persico from the 1950s to the early 1970s.

Controlled unions
N.Y.C. District Council of Carpenters The Colombo and Genovese families ran the Council from 1991 to 1996, extorting huge amounts of money from several N.Y.C. District Council of Carpenters union locals. Colombo capos Thomas Petrizzo and Vincent "Jimmy" Angellino controlled Council President Frederick Devine. The two crime families illegally used the Council to create hundreds of "no show" absentee jobs for their associates. In 1998, government witnesses Sammy Gravano and Vincent Cafaro testified against Devine. He was found guilty of embezzling union funds and sentenced to 15 months in prison.

Former members and associates
Andrew "Mush" Russo — also known as "Andy Mush", "Mushy", was a longtime member of the family who served as boss following Carmine Persico's death. Russo's cousin was longtime Colombo family boss Carmine Persico In November 1986, Russo was sentenced to 14 years in prison. He was released on July 29, 1994, under special parole conditions. In August 1999, Russo was convicted of jury tampering and sentenced to 57 months, he was also sentenced to 123 months for both parole violation and his involvement in a racketeering case of a Long Island carting company. In March 2010, after his parole period expired, Russo became street boss. In January 2011, Russo was indicted on federal racketeering charges. On March 21, 2013, Russo was sentenced to thirty three months for racketeering. He was released from prison in 2013. Russo's cousin and longtime family boss Carmine Persico died on March 7, 2019, in prison. On September 14, 2021, Andrew Russo was indicted and identified as the "official boss" of the Colombo family. The indictment charged boss Russo along with underboss Benjamin Castellazzo, consigliere Ralph DiMatteo and three captains Theodore Persico Jr., Richard Ferrara and Vincent Ricciardo with infiltrating and taking control of a Queens-based labor union. Russo died of natural causes on April 18, 2022, while awaiting trial.
Dominic "Donnie Shacks" Montemarano — former member. He was released from prison in 1997, Montemarano moved to Los Angeles and has invested in movies. Montemarano died of COVID-19 in January 2021.
Theodore "Teddy" Persico — brother to Carmine Persico, uncle to Alphonse "Little Allie Boy" Persico, and father to Theodore N. Persico Jr. Theodore Sr. was a capo in Brooklyn during the 1970s. He served on the family ruling panel from the early 1990s until his arrest and conviction. Theodore Sr. was released from prison on October 9, 2013. Died in 2017. 
Thomas Petrizzo – born in 1933 in Brooklyn. Petrizzo was the owner of 4 companies based in New Jersey which he had used to money launder through. In 1985 and 1986, he earned $2.1 million for storing, shaping and delivering steel bars from Milstein Properties. He had a strong influence in the labor unions, specifically the construction industry. Petrizzo provided the steel frames, columns and girders for the Jacob K. Javits Convention Center, Battery Park City projects, the new Federal courthouse in Foley Square and many Manhattan skyscrapers. He was promoted to capo during the late 1980s due to his influence in the unions and his multi-million dollar operations, however he was demoted in his old age as a result of power loss. In December 1993, he was arrested alongside 5 other Colombo members. The FBI alleged that he extorted $1.3 million from a Swiss engineering company and camouflaged the payoffs as consulting fees into his own businesses. He was arrested among numerous Colombo associates and members, including his former son-in-law Michael Persico, son of Carmine Persico. The scam consisted of placing vending machines inside Colombo family controlled car dealerships, Petrizzo was also charged with extorting construction debris removal unions at Ground Zero; he was acquitted. In 1996, he pleaded guilty to extortion. Petrizzo died on September 11, 2022. 

Nicholas Rizzo – was a soldier operating in extortion and loan sharking rackets, in January 2011, the then 83 year old mobster had his first arrest on gambling charges. He was later convicted to 6 months in a medical facility, but given a humanitarian release. But a week later spotted in a social club ran by the Bonanno acting boss Vincent "Vinny T.V." Badalamenti. He died on May 26, 2022.
Richard "Richie Nerves" Fusco – former consigliere. On January 20, 2011, Fusco was indicted on federal racketeering charges. On September 29, 2011, Fusco pleaded guilty to running a shakedown scheme against the Gambino family; he was sentenced to four months in prison. Fusco was incarcerated at the Metropolitan Detention Center in Brooklyn. Fusco died in September 2013.
Michael "Yuppie Don" Franzese – son of John Franzese. Michael organized a highly lucrative gasoline scam racket with the Russian mafia.  Franzese was promoted to caporegime in 1980 and retired in 1995 after he was released from prison.
Joseph "Jo Jo" Russo – the eldest son of Andrew Russo, convicted in 1994 with his cousin Anthony "Chuckie" Russo. Both men received life sentences after former FBI agent Lindley DeVecchio testified against them. In 2007, Joseph Russo died of kidney cancer in prison.
Salvatore "Sally" D'Ambrosio – During the 1960s First Colombo War, D'Ambrosio and future boss Carmine Persico attempted to murder mobster Larry Gallo.Tuohy, John William and Becker, Ed (June 5, 2000) "Umberto’s Clam House Opens For Business, And Bullets, Again" Rick Porrello's AmericanMafia.com D'Ambrosio also participated in the murder of Joseph Gioelli.
Nicholas "Jiggs" Forlano – former capo who ran a loan-sharking operations with Charles "Ruby" Stein. In the 1970s, Forlano moved to Fort Lauderdale, Florida and started operating there. In 1977, Forlano died of a heart attack at the Hialeah race track in Florida.
Frank "Frankie Shots" Abbatemarco – was born in 1899 and grew up in Red Hook, Brooklyn. During the 1950s, Abbatemarco was a powerful capo in Profaci family controlling Red Hook. On November 4, 1959, Abbatemarco was murdered.
Anthony "Big Tony" Peraino – associate who helped finance groundbreaking adult entertainment movie "Deep Throat". Died of natural causes in 1996.
Dominick "Little Dom" Cataldo – died in prison 1990.
Ralph "Little Ralphie" Scopo – influential soldier who ran the Cement Club. Died in prison 1993.
Ralph Scopo Jr. – son of Ralph Scopo. Died under indictment for extortion in 2013.
Antonio Cottone – deported to Sicily, where he became the Mafia boss of Villabate, the home town for the Profaci family. Cotonne was murdered in 1956.
Benedetto "Benny" Aloi – capo and brother to Vincent Aloi. During the 1990s Third Colombo war, Aloi was Orena's underboss. In 1991, Aloi was convicted in the Windows Case, was released from prison on March 17, 2009. He died on April 7, 2011.
Leonard "Lenny Dell" Dello — was a former member of the Gallo crew. Dello died 2009.
John "Sonny" Franzese – former underboss. He died at age 103 on February 24, 2020.
Charles "Moose" Panarella — a hitman who spent time in Las Vegas. Declared mentally unfit for trial, under house arrest. He died on July 18, 2017.

Associates
Frank Persico — the son of Theodore "Teddy" Persico and cousin of acting Colombo boss Alphonse "Allie" Persico. Frank was a stockbroker who was sentenced to five years in prison for a $15 million stock swindle. Frank was released on July 12, 2006; four months later, Frank died of a heart attack."Frank Persico" Bureau of Prisons Inmate Locator
Hugh "Apples" MacIntosh – an Irish-American enforcer for Carmine Persico during the 1960s. In 1969, MacIntosh was imprisoned on hijacking charges. In 1975, he was released and went on to control several clubs and loan sharking rings for Persico. In 1982, McIntosh was caught bribing an Internal Revenue Service agent for Carmine Persico's early release. McIntosh was imprisoned after the Colombo trial and released on December 31, 1992. MacIntosh was later arrested for meeting with mobster Daniel Persico and was returned to prison. McIntosh died on November 10, 1997.
Charles Ruby Stein – "loanshark to the stars"'', was an associate and business partner to Nicholas Forlano. Stein ran gambling clubs on the Upper West Side of Manhattan. In the early 1970s, mobster Jimmy Coonan became Stein's bodyguard. Ironically, Coonan and The Westies murdered Stein in 1977.
Nicholas "Nicky" Bianco – a Gallo crew member, Bianco later joined the Patriarca crime family. Bianco died in prison in 1994.
Gerard Pappa — a family associate who transferred to become a soldier in the Genovese crime family working with Peter Saverio in the New York windows scheme. Was murdered in 1980 by the Cataldo brothers.
Michael Rizzitello — a Gallo crew member, later joined the Los Angeles crime family. He died in prison in 2005.

Government informants and witnesses
Members
Salvatore "Big Sal" Miciotta - former captain. Miciotta allegedly became a soldier for the Colombo family alongside Vincent "Jimmy" Angelino, Gerard "Jerry Brown" Clemenza, Michael Franzese, John Minerva, Vito Guzzo Sr. and Joseph Peraino Jr. on Halloween Day 1975 or 1978. he first became acquainted with Lucchese crime family underboss Anthony Casso. During the Colombo mob war in the early 1990s, he was an Orena faction loyalist. In May 1993, he approached the FBI with the offer of becoming a government witness. According to Miciotta, in late 1993, Victor Orena asked multi-millionaire businessman John Rosatti to provide cars from his dealership to be used to carry out murders, Rosatti declined and instead handed over $50,000 to Orena.
Carmine Sessa - former consigliere. In the early 1990s, Sessa met with the Genovese, Lucchese and Gambino crime families and pledged his loyalty to imprisoned Colombo boss Carmine Persico, who opposed Victor Orena at the time. Sessa was arrested in 1993 and agreed to cooperate and become a government witness. He admitted to participating in 13 murders, including former Brooklyn Colombo captain, Jimmy Angelino. He was released from prison in 1997, however he was shortly after sentenced to imprisonment and was released in 2000. He testified against former FBI agent Lindley DeVecchio in October 2007.
John Pate - former capo and loyalist to the Persico faction. In April 1972, he was arrested for possession of a handgun alongside Charles Panarella, Carmine Persico and Gennaro Langella. He was active in Staten Island and was promoted to captain in the late 1980s. In mid-1992, he was arrested on murder and loansharking charges. It is believed that he became an informer around 1993.
Rocco Cagno - former soldier. Colombo mobster Jimmy Randazzo was his sponsor, who was murdered in May 1993. He was inducted into the Colombo crime family in 1987. He participated in the murder of Colombo captain Jimmy Angelino at his home in November 1988. In November 1993, he was indicted on murder and firearm charges and began to cooperate with the government in March 1994.
Joseph "Joe Campy" Campanella – former soldier. He was a close ally of William Cutolo. Campanella was shot twice by Vincent "Chicky" DeMartino with a .357 Magnum on July 16, 2001, in Coney Island after being wrongly suspected of cooperating with the authorities; DeMartino was sentenced to 25 years in prison for the attempted murder.
Michael "Mickey" Souza - born in 1968. In December 2006, he was arrested alongside 12 other mobsters from the Colombo and Gambino crime families on charges of robbery, assault, weapon possession, loansharking, gambling and drug dealing, as part of an 8-month investigation by the DEA. He and his older brother were accused of planning Hector Pagan's murder, a Bonanno crime family associate, over a financial dispute. Souza allegedly purchased a gun silencer, however he never managed to use it on Pagan due to his arrest. It is believed he became an informer around 2007.
Paul "Paulie Guns" Bevacqua – former acting capo of the Gioeli crew. He was a supporter of the Orena faction who rivalled against the Persico faction during the early 1990s. It is believed that he wore a wire microphone around 2008. He died on November 11, 2011.
Dino "Big Dino" Calabro - former captain. He has allegedly participated in 8 murders. Calabro is suspected of participating in the August 1997 murder of NYPD officer Ralph C. Dols, on orders of former Colombo consigliere Joel Cacace. He began cooperating after his June 2008 arrest, he was arrested alongside 2 other Colombo soldier's on charges of drug trafficking, robbery, extortion, murder and loansharking. In November 2017, he was sentenced to 11 years imprisonment.
Frank "Frankie Blue Eyes" Sparaco - former soldier. He was a part of the Persico faction during the early 1990s. In 1993, he was sentenced to 24 years in prison for participating in 5 murders. While in prison, he scammed former U.S. House of Representatives member John LeBoutillier of $800,000. In 2009, he officially agreed to cooperate with the government.
Reynold Maragni – former capo who was active in South Florida. In 2000, he was indicted on charges of credit card and bank fraud scams, loansharking and illegal gambling. A year later, he was sentenced to 2 years in prison.  He was arrested in January 2011 and accused of distributing marijuana, smuggling cigarettes, extorting members of a cement and concrete union in Queens, and operating an illegal gambling ring with former Colombo captain Joseph Parna; Maragni agreed to become an informant immediately after his arrest. From April to December 2011, he wore a watch with a microphone and recorded many conversations.
Anthony "Big Anthony" Russo – former acting capo, not related to Andrew Russo. In 2011, Russo was charged with the 1993 murder of Orena loyalist Joseph Scopo and agreed to be a federal witness.
Gregory Scarpa Sr. – notorious hitman and FBI informant from the 1970s to 1994.  Scarpa Sr. died in prison from AIDS–related complications.
Lawrence "Larry" Mazza - former soldier, hitman and protégé of Colombo crime family captain Greg Scarpa. It is noted that he had an affair with Scarpa's wife, Linda Schiro. Mazza has admitted to murdering four people, including the January 1992 murder of Nicky Grancio, using a 12-gauge shotgun which was allegedly stolen from a New Jersey police car. He had previously witnessed the December 1991 killing of Vincent Fusaro by Scarpa, who shot Fusaro in the neck, body and back of the head with an M52 rifle while he hung up a Christmas garland on the door of his home in Brooklyn. Mazza has allegedly participated in around 25 murders. Sometime in the mid-1990s after his arrest by the FBI, he agreed to cooperate. Mazza has since relocated to Florida and became a fitness personal trainer. He released a book titled "The Life: A True Story about a Brooklyn Boy Seduced into the Dark World of the Mafia."

Associates

Joseph "Joe Pesh" Luparelli – former Colombo associate and bodyguard to Joseph Yacovelli. He served as one of the drivers in the April 1972 murder of Joe Gallo. Some time after the Gallo murder, he believed the Gallo-murder participants were planning to have him murdered. He flew to California to meet with FBI agents. Albert A. Seedman requested that Luparelli should be brought to New York. He was accused of harbouring Joseph Russo, following a 1970 murder in New Jersey.
Kenny "Kenji" Gallo – former associate of the Los Angeles and Colombo crime families. Gallo first met Jerry Zimmerman while he was active in the porn industry, who introduced him to underboss Sonny Franzese. He later became acquainted with Teddy Persico Jr., the nephew of Colombo boss Carmine Persico. He cooperated in 1996
Salvatore "Crazy Sal" Polisi – former associate of the Colombo and Gambino crime families. He was active in hijacking, illegal gambling and robbery.
John Franzese Jr. - John Franzese Jr. wanted a way out of his life and was approached by the FBI with a proposition that he become an informant and he accepted. One part of the agreement he made with the FBI prior to testifying was that he would not profit from his story as a mafia figure. He was allegedly also responsible for his father John "Sonny" Franzese's fourth parole violation, but was accepted back into his confidence after denying the allegations in tears, saying, "I would never do that, no matter what kind of trouble I had." In 2005, Franzese Jr. wore a wire around his father. John Franzese Jr. testified twice against his father, the last time his father attempted to have him killed; he later lived under witness protection. In 2010, Franzese Jr. admitted that he received $50,000 from the FBI as a cooperating witness. With the help of Franzese Jr.'s testimony, his father was sentenced on January 14, 2011, to eight years in prison for extorting two Manhattan strip clubs, running a loanshark operation and extorting a pizzeria on Long Island. He is the first son of a New York mobster to turn state's evidence and testify against his father.

References

Capeci, Jerry (2001) The Complete Idiot's Guide to the Mafia Alpha. 
Raab, Selwyn (2006) The Five Families: The Rise, Decline & Resurgence of America's Most Powerful Mafia Empire. New York: St. Martins Press.

External links
 The Colombo/Persico/Orena Family (p. 15-17) in the 1989 Annual Report of the SCI
 The Colombo Family by TruTV at the Internet Archive

 
Organizations established in 1928
1928 establishments in New York (state)
Organizations based in New York City
Five Families
Gangs in Florida
Gangs in Massachusetts
Gangs in New Jersey
Gangs in New York City